The brown-rumped seedeater (Crithagra tristriata) is a species of finch in the family Fringillidae.
It is found in the highlands of Ethiopia, Eritrea and Somalia.
It is widespread in towns, villages gardens, plantations and upland heath.

The brown-rumped seedeater was formerly placed in the genus Serinus but phylogenetic analysis using mitochondrial and nuclear DNA sequences found that the genus was polyphyletic. The genus was therefore split and a number of species including the brown-rumped seedeater were moved to the resurrected genus Crithagra.

Description

Length 13 cm. This is a drab uniform grey-brown canary with a small white supercilium. It has a plain (not streaked or spotted) breast with white under the chin. The uniformity of its drabness means its eponymous 'brown rump' is often not apparent.

References

 Sinclair, Ian & Ryan, Peter (2003) Birds of Africa south of the Sahara, Struik, Cape Town.

brown-rumped seedeater
Birds of the Horn of Africa
brown-rumped seedeater
Taxonomy articles created by Polbot